This is a list of lakes in the Cook Islands.

Lakes

Atiu 
 Lake Tiroto

Mangaia 
 Lake Tiriara

Mitiaro 
 Rotonui (big lake)
 Rotoiti (small lake)

External links

 http://www.cookislands.org.uk/mitiaro.html

Cook Islands